Aq Bolagh-e Meydan (also Romanized as Āq Bolāgh-e Meydān and Āqbolāgh Meydān) is a village in Chaldoran-e Shomali Rural District, in the Central District of Chaldoran County, West Azerbaijan Province, Iran. At the 2006 census, its population was 31, in 11 families.

References 

Populated places in Chaldoran County